Canadian Americans is a term that can be applied to American citizens whose ancestry is wholly or partly Canadian, or citizens of either country that hold dual citizenship.

The term Canadian can mean a nationality or an ethnicity. Canadians are considered North Americans due their residing in the North American continent. English-speaking Canadian immigrants easily integrate and assimilate into northern and western U.S. states as a result of many cultural similarities, and in the similar accent in spoken English. French-speaking Canadians, because of language and culture, tend to take longer to assimilate. However, by the 3rd generation, they are often fully culturally assimilated, and the Canadian identity is more or less folklore. This took place, even though half of the population of the province of Quebec emigrated to the US between 1840 and 1930. Many New England cities formed 'Little Canadas', but many of these have gradually disappeared.

This cultural "invisibility" within the larger US population is seen as creating stronger affinity amongst Canadians living in the US than might otherwise exist. According to US Census estimates, the number of Canadian residents was around 640,000 in 2000. Some sources have cited the number to possibly be over 1,000,000. This number, though, is far smaller than the number of Americans who can trace part or the whole of their ancestry to Canada. The percentage of these in the New England states is almost 25% of the total population.

In some regions of the United States, especially New England or the Midwest, a Canadian American often means one whose ancestors came from Canada.

American cities founded by or named after Canadians
Biloxi, founded by Pierre Le Moyne d'Iberville
Bourbonnais, named after François Bourbonnais
Chandler, founded by Dr. Alexander J. (A.J.) Chandler
Dubuque, founded by and named after Julien Dubuque
Hamtramck, named after Jean François Hamtramck
Juneau, named after Joe Juneau
Milwaukee, founded by Solomon Juneau 
Mobile, founded by Pierre LeMoyne d'Iberville
New Orleans, founded by Lemoyne de Bienville
Ontario, founded by George Chaffey
Saint Paul, first settled by Pierre Parrant
Vincennes, founded by François-Marie Bissot

Canadian American Day
The Connecticut State Senate unanimously passed a bill in 2009, making June 24 Canadian American Day in the state of Connecticut. The bill allows state officials to hold ceremonies at the capitol and other places each year to honor Americans of Canadian ancestry.

Aboriginal Canadian Americans
As a consequence of Article 3 of the Jay Treaty of 1794, official First Nations status, or in the United States, Native American status, also confers the right to live and work on either side of the border. Unlike the U.S., Canada has not codified the Jay Treaty. Canadian courts readily reject the Jay Treaty free passage of goods right.

Study
Some institutions in the United States focus on Canadian-American studies, including the Canadian-American Center at the University of Maine, the Center for Canadian American studies at Western Washington University, and the University at Buffalo Canadian-American Studies Committee.

Notable people

See also
American Canadians

:Category:American people of Canadian descent
Canada–United States relations
Franco-Americans
French Canadians
Hyphenated American
Little Canadas
Quebec diaspora

References

Further reading
 Fedunkiw, Marianne P. "Canadian Americans" in Gale Encyclopedia of Multicultural America, edited by Thomas Riggs, (3rd ed., vol. 1, Gale, 2014), pp. 395-405. Online

Simpson, Jeffrey (2000). Star-Spangled Canadians: Canadians Living the American Dream. HarperCollins

External links
Connect2Canada.com

Canada–United States relations
Canadian American

Canadian diaspora in North America